Edward Gray or Eddie Gray is the name of:

 Eddie Gray (Australian footballer) (1915–2009), Australian rules footballer for Collingwood
 Eddie Gray (footballer, born 1934), Scottish former professional footballer
 Eddie Gray (footballer, born 1948), Scottish former international footballer and Leeds United manager
 Eddie Gray (musician), member of Tommy James and the Shondells
 Eddie Gray (racing driver) (1920–1969), race car driver
 'Monsewer' Eddie Gray (1898–1969), British music hall entertainer
 Ed Gray (born 1975), basketball player
 Ed Gray (Canadian football) (1934–1976), Canadian footballer
 Ted Gray (1924–2011), baseball player
 Edward Gray (tennis), American tennis player
 Edward Leslie Gray (1895–1992), politician and member of the Legislative Assembly of Alberta from Alberta, Canada
 Edward W. Gray (1870–1942), United States Representative from New Jersey
 Edward Whitaker Gray (1748–1806), English botanist and secretary to the Royal Society
 Edward "Doc" Gray, a character in Adventures of Gallant Bess

See also
 Edmund Grey (disambiguation)
 Edward Grey (disambiguation)
 Gray (surname)